The FIL World Luge Championships 1957 took place in Davos, Switzerland. It marked the first time the event was held under the auspices of the International Luge Federation (FIL) which was formed earlier that year. Also, it was the first time the championships had been held after being cancelled the previous year.

Men's singles

Women's singles

Men's doubles

Medal table

References
FIL-Luge.org list of World luge champions.  - Accessed January 31, 2008.
Men's doubles World Champions
Men's singles World Champions
Women's singles World Champions

FIL World Luge Championships
1957 in luge
Sport in Davos
1957 in Swiss sport
Luge in Switzerland